The Old Middletown Post Office, in Middletown, Connecticut, also known as the U.S. Post Office, was built in 1916.  It was listed on the National Register of Historic Places (NRHP) in 1982. The building is also on the NRHP as a contributing property of the Main Street Historic District.

Structure
The building is made of limestone using a structural system of load bearing masonry.  It was designed by the Office of the Supervising Architect under James A. Wetmore and built by W. H. Frissell & Co. of New York City.

Relationship to surroundings 
This fine, two-story example of the Renaissance Revival style is located on the south west corner of Court and Main Streets facing the Connecticut River. Across Court Street to the north is the massive Liberty Bank building and to its south across a parking lot; is the Bank of America building. Together these three buildings give this section of the central business district a solid and classical look.

Significance 
In 1911, the United States Government decided to build a new post office facility in Middletown. Preparations for construction began shortly thereafter. The selection of the building's location was a topic of much controversy. The government finally chose this location, federally owned since 1841, in the center of Middletown's commercial and financial district.

Contemporary sources indicate that the new post office was a source of civic pride for the citizens of Middletown. Its facade of smooth limestone distinguished it in a city center where brick and Portland brownstone were the common building materials. The classical facade displays a two-story arrangement of arched windows and pilasters supporting an elaborate entablature. The interior features a large two story open lobby.

The old post office ceased operation in 1977, ending 136 years of federal use of that site.

Current use and condition 
Liberty Bank uses this building as office space and keeps the building in good condition.

See also 

National Register of Historic Places listings in Middletown, Connecticut
List of United States post offices

References 

Middletown, Connecticut Historical and Architectural Resources. Volume III, Card Number 167. Elizabeth Loomis. June, 1978.

Post office buildings on the National Register of Historic Places in Connecticut
Buildings and structures in Middletown, Connecticut
Post office buildings in Connecticut
Government buildings completed in 1916
Renaissance Revival architecture in Connecticut
National Register of Historic Places in Middlesex County, Connecticut
Historic district contributing properties in Connecticut